Miguel Ángel López Pérez (born 5 April 1983) former Spanish football coach and the manager of Uzbekistan Super League club Surkhon Termez.

Playing career
Born in Madrid, López represented Vicálvaro, Roma and San Fernando Henares as a youth before retiring at the age of 18 to start his studies.

Coaching career

After retiring, he started working as a fitness coach at CD Coslada, subsequently having the same role at Internacional de Madrid, San Fernando CD and Getafe CF B.

In 2007, López was included in Michael Laudrup's squad in Getafe's first team, again as a fitness coach.

López followed Cosmin Contra to Getafe, Guangzhou R&F and Al Shabab Al Arabi Club Dubai, always as his assistant. In July 2017, he returned to Spain to work as Javier Casquero's assistant at Recreativo de Huelva, but was appointed manager in November after Casquero's dismissal.

López was sacked by Recre on 11 February 2018, and on 10 October, he took over the Equatorial Guinea national team manager role. On 28 September 2019, he resigned from the Nzalang.

On 27 December 2019, López was named at the helm of Ecuadorian club Delfín for the ensuing campaign. He was dismissed after three league matches.

In September 2020 he became manager of Greek club Volos. On 20 April 2021, he was released with a mutual agreement from Volos.

In May 2021 he moved to Atromitos. In January 2022 he became the manager of Uzbekistan Super League club Surkhon Termez.

References

External links
 

1983 births
Living people
Spanish football managers
Getafe CF non-playing staff
Segunda División B managers
Recreativo de Huelva managers
Guangzhou City F.C. non-playing staff
Al Shabab Al Arabi Club Dubai non-playing staff
Equatorial Guinea national football team managers
Delfín S.C. managers
Spanish expatriate football managers
Spanish expatriate sportspeople in China
Spanish expatriate sportspeople in the United Arab Emirates
Spanish expatriate sportspeople in Equatorial Guinea
Spanish expatriate sportspeople in Ecuador
Expatriate football managers in China
Expatriate football managers in the United Arab Emirates
Expatriate football managers in Equatorial Guinea
Expatriate football managers in Ecuador
Volos FC managers
Spanish expatriate sportspeople in Greece
Expatriate football managers in Greece
Atromitos F.C. managers
Spanish expatriate sportspeople in Uzbekistan
Expatriate football managers in Uzbekistan
Surkhon Termez managers